The College of Engineering, Pulivendula is a constituent college of Jawaharlal Nehru Technological University Anantapur (JNTUA) in India. The college was established in 2006, and is 3 kilometres north of Pulivendula, Andhra Pradesh.

Overview
JNTUA College of Engineering, Pulivendula was established in 2006. Its foundation was laid in 2005 by Dr. Y. S. Rajasekhara Reddy. The campus is located in Pulivendula, Kadapa District in Andhra Pradesh, India, and is spread across . It has six academic blocks, one administrative building, a central library, four hostel blocks, two dining areas, staff quarters, and a guest house.

The college started its first academic year with five academic branches, including CSE, ECE, MEC, EEE, and BioTech. Later, in 2011 the Civil Engineering branch was added. The first three years saw roughly 300 students enrolled in each branch.

The academic block was inaugurated on 25 December 2006 and the department was later provided with separate blocks: a total of 6 academic blocks and one administration building. A library, staff quarters, hostel, and a guest house were added.

The college also inaugurated the statue of Jawaharlal Nehru.

References

External links
 JNTUA College of Engineering Pulivendula

2006 establishments in Andhra Pradesh
Educational institutions established in 2006
Engineering colleges in Andhra Pradesh
Universities and colleges in Kadapa district